"You Can't Hide Beautiful" is a song written by Michael Dulaney and Jason Sellers, and recorded by Canadian country music artist Aaron Lines. It was released in August 2002 as the first single from Lines' album, Living Out Loud. The song reached number 4 on the Billboard Hot Country Singles & Tracks chart in February 2003. It was also Lines' only entry on the Billboard Hot 100, peaking at number 38.

Music video
The music video was directed by Thom Oliphant and premiered in August 2002.

Chart performance
"You Can't Hide Beautiful" debuted at number 58 on the U.S. Billboard Hot Country Singles & Tracks for the week of August 17, 2002.

Year-end charts

References

2002 singles
Aaron Lines songs
Songs written by Jason Sellers
RCA Records Nashville singles
Songs written by Michael Dulaney
Song recordings produced by Chris Farren (country musician)
2002 songs